Chinese property law has existed in various forms for centuries. After the Chinese Communist Revolution in 1949, most land is owned by collectivities or by the state; the Property Law of the People's Republic of China passed in 2007 codified property rights.

History

Imperial China
Use of property was divided into topsoil (tianpi) and subsoil (tiangu) rights. Landlords with subsoil rights had a permanent claim to the property if they paid taxes and received official seals from the government, but did not have rights to actively use the land. Instead, those with topsoil rights paid the subsoil landlord a fixed rent (or part of the proceeds of what was produced on the land) for not only the right to farm and live on the land, but the right to independently sell or lease the topsoil rights to another party. So as long as another party held topsoil rights, the party holding subsoil did not have right to actively use the land or evict the topsoil owner. Land, like other forms of property, was seen as being held collectively by the family and not individuals within the family. Another concept in imperial Chinese property rights was dianmai (典賣/典卖), more commonly known as huomai (活賣/活卖), or conditional sales of property that allowed the seller (i.e., his family) to buy back the land at the original price (without interest). The assumption was that land, having been held by a family for generations, should stay with the same family. From the Sui dynasty onwards, women could not hold property directly and, for land to stay in the same family, it had to pass between male heirs following the rule of primogeniture. The Imperial times were time and space dependent and were affected by wars, rebellions and natural disaster. During such times, there were frequent shifts in ownership as abandoned land was reclaimed after former owners had fled or died. During the Qing dynasty (1644-1911) some titling of land ownership did take place, albeit not systematically or at a national level, and historical titles have been handed down to the present. Newly accrued land along rivers, creeks and other waters – so-called riparian rights – was clearly designated as state property, and the Qing government repeatedly emphasized this in imperial edicts.

Nationalist China 
During the rule of the Nationalist government (1912–1949), communal and customary rights gave land tenure to landlords, nobles, religious institutions, and village communities. Meanwhile, the state drafted property laws, which were based on German and Japanese civil law traditions.  Under Nationalist rule, the private sector owned most forests. After they had gained power, the CCP gradually worked towards the abolition of private ownership. Private forest holdings continued to exist until the collectivization of the countryside.

Communist China

In the areas controlled by Communist forces traditional land tenure was broken up through Land Reform. In the 1930s Land Reform in the old revolutionary base areas, such as the Jiangxi Soviet and the Shaan-Gan-Ning Border Region, was carried out with the least possible social disruption. Middle and rich peasants were allowed to keep part of their land holdings, whereas expropriated landlords were allocated sufficient land to make a living. Yet, directly after the Second World War, Land Reform took a more radical turn. It was not until a speech by Mao in 1948 that a moderate stance was taken once more.

There were several times of changes in ownership and control over land in China. Regarding rural land, these changes began with the establishment of the Higher Agricultural Production Cooperatives in 1956. Thereafter rural private land ownership was effectively abolished through Land Reform, which left land in the hands of the state or the collective.

China's Land Reform (1950-1952) was one of the largest examples of land expropriation in world history. In the process, between 200 and 240 million acres of arable land were redistributed to approximately 75 million peasant families.

Until decollectivization in the mid-1980s, there were only two factors making for change in land policies: the level of collective ownership and the extent of freedom in private land use. The Great Leap Forward (1958–1962) forced the central leadership to decentralize land ownership from the commune to the production team. This was laid down in Party regulations promulgated in 1962 (the Sixty Articles)Freedom in the private use (not ownership) of land shifted various times. Before 1958, when rural China was organized into huge administrative units—the people's communes—farmers were allocated small plots of collective land for their own use (ziliudi). Depending on the region, farming was more or less privatized, with managerial responsibilities vested in the household. Farm households negotiated contracts under which they had to deliver grain quota to the state at low fixed prices. The surplus grain above the quota could be sold freely at private markets. These privileges were rescinded twice (and subsequently reinstalled) during the Great Leap Forward and the Great Proletarian Cultural Revolution (1966–76).

In the case of urban land, after the nationalization of industries and companies in the early 1950s, it was deemed state-owned, although not legally stipulated for a long period of time. Land owned by the state was seen as "absolute" and therefore, did not warrant a title; a principle adhered to – and enshrined in regulation – until today. However, the notion that urban land is tantamount to state ownership and, therefore, excludes private ownership had been formally disputed by the State Land Administration up to the early 1980s.

Deng Xiaoping's rule
In the era of Deng Xiaoping, a fundamental legal source of the regime of property and property rights in the PRC lay in the Constitution of PRC enacted in 1982. The 1982 constitution provided for the "socialist public ownership" of the means of production, which takes two forms- state ownership and collective ownership. In 2004, the fourth amendment to the constitution was made. Article 13 of the constitution provided that: "The lawful private property of citizens shall be inviolable. The country shall protect in accordance with law citizens' private property rights and inheritance rights. The country may, as necessitated by public interest, expropriate or requisition citizens' private property and pay compensation therefor." It can thus be seen that China's property laws have been undergoing developments. The most recent development would be the enactment of the Property Law in March 2007 (after 14 years of debates), which is noted as one of the most important core components of the evolving civil law in the PRC.

Real property rights
An investor who wants to invest or develop land or property in China must bear in mind China's property laws, most notably the property law introduced in 2007, which for the first time protects the interest of private investors to the same extent as that of national interests.

Types
Real property rights in China can generally be grouped into three types: ownership rights, usufructuary rights, and security rights.

Ownership rights
Ownership rights are protected under Article 39 of The Property Law of the People's Republic of China, which gives the owner the right to possess, utilize, dispose of and obtain profits from the real property. However, this right has to comply with laws and social morality. It can harm neither public interests nor the legitimate rights and interests of others.

In general, rural collectives own agricultural land and the state owns urban land. However, Article 70 of The Property Law allows for ownership of exclusive parts within an apartment building, which endorses the individual ownership of apartments.

Usufructuary rights
The owner of a usufructuary right has the right to possess, utilize and obtain profits from the real properties owned by others. The obligee may not intervene in the exercise of rights by the owner of the usufructuary right. There are several types of usufructuary rights. These include the right to land contractual management, the right to use of construction land, the right to use of residential housing land and easement.

Right to land contractual management
The right to land contractual management allows a contractor of the right to possess, utilize and obtain profits from agricultural land. This right is transferable, but the land use rights based on agricultural household contracts cannot be changed arbitrarily for non-agricultural purposes.

Right to use of construction land

The right to use of construction land is only with regard to State-owned land, and the owner of the right is able to build buildings and their accessory facilities. This is in addition to being able to possess, utilize and obtain profits from the land. This right may be established by means of assignment or transfer, but transfer is limited. The ownership of the buildings will change together with the land. As a protection of the right, the term of the right shall be automatically renewed upon expiration If it has to be taken back, compensation shall be given.

Right to use of residential housing land
The owner of the right to use of residential housing land can possess and utilize such land as collectively owned, and can build residential houses and their accessory facilities. The Law of Land Administration and other regulations will apply to the attainment, exercise and assignment of the right to the use of residential land.

Easement
The owner of easement has the right to use the real property of others to benefit his own real property. Easement will be governed by the terms of a contract.

Security rights
Forms of security rights include mortgages, pledges and liens. Holders of security rights have priority if a debtor defaults on his obligation. This is to ensure obligations are met. Security rights do not exist independently, but require a valid principal claim, and lapse when the debt lapses.

Procedures in engaging in property investments

Buying land
Foreign investors are not allowed to buy land in China. The land in China belongs to the state and the collectives.

Obtaining land use rights
A land user obtains only the land use right, not the land or any resources in or below the land. A land grant contract shall be entered into between the land user and the land administration department of the people's government at municipal or county level.

The land grant contract must be signed. Land use rights can be obtained from the land administration department by agreement, tender or auction. Regardless of the method by which the land use rights is granted, a contract for grant of land use right, or more commonly known as a land grant contract, must be entered into by the land user and the local land administration authority or municipal governments at or above the county level as grantor.

Article 12 of the Provisional Regulations on Grant and Assignment of Urban State-owned Land Use Right states the different duration of rights provided for different purposes.

Registration
In China, there is no unified official procedure for the rules on the registration of land-use rights and the ownership of property. All interests in land must be recorded in the official government register. This register is proof of ownership. However, different interests might be registered under different registries. The Property Law only offers a general guideline as to recordation. Peter Ho has described the recordation of Chinese property rights per institution as it exists until 2014. An overview is in the table below.

Article 6 provides for a general registration requirement in the cases of creation, modification, transfer, and elimination of rights to immovables.

Article 10(2)(l) requires a unified registration system for all real property rights, but this unified system is currently only adopted in tier one cities like Beijing and Shanghai. The unification of interests in a single registry is still not prevalent in the smaller cities and will take more time before its implementation.

Furthermore, Article 10(1) allows for respective local rules of registration.

Function of notaries
China has a system of public notaries which are a subordinate agency of the Ministry of Justice of the People's Republic of China. They are responsible for certification of property titles.

Government powers and procedures to expropriate real property
The description below applies to the post-reform legal arrangements and should not be confused with nationalisation of property before 1978.

Rural property expropriation procedure
The Chinese authorities are empowered under the Constitution and various statutes to expropriate land use rights contracted to individuals as well as ownership rights from collectives. Since all land is owned either collectively or by the state, expropriation of rural land only requires the withdrawal of land use rights for the reason of "public interest."

The definition of public interest is intentionally vague, and a general list of such interests has been expounded in an attempt to define what it means.

These include interests such as defence, transportation infrastructure, education and health.

Currently, the types of compensation are:
Compensation for loss of land
Resettlement subsidy
Compensation for structures and standing crops

However, the first two are paid to the collective landowners instead of the farmers. Compensation for non-land rural assets is also highly discretionary.

Once the farmers and collective land owners are notified, the expropriation can commence. Disputes regarding the compensation and resettlement shall not affect the implementation of the expropriation.

Urban property expropriation procedure
The Land Administrative Law provides five situations under which land use rights may be withdrawn:

Public interests
Renovation of old towns
Expiration of land terms without renewal
Dissolution of holder of allocated land rights
Termination of use of public infrastructure
The rights holder is entitled to "appropriate compensation" in the first two situations. As the state owns the land, compensation is not made for the loss of the rights holder's land use rights, but for the private property which he had lost. It is made either in cash (based on market prices) and accounts for any moving expenses or resettlement subsidies, or in kind (in the form of a replacement structure).

Under the current legal framework, land developers no longer have the legal power to expropriate, and are no longer involved in the demolition and relocation procedures. The local government or non-profit organisations are now in charge of land expropriation and compensation.

By minimising the business interests in the expropriation procedure, incidents of forced expropriation might be reduced.

If a rights holder wants to protect his property, he can evoke certain procedural safeguards, which include: 
Application to urban condemnation administration for administrative review if agreement is not reached
If review is unsatisfactory, a lawsuit may be filed within 3 months

In the event that an agreement cannot be reached between homeowners and the government, the expropriation can only be carried out  judicial review.

New regulations effective from January 21, 2011, have provided hope for the future with regards to several controversies surrounding urban property expropriation.

In January 2011,a 54-year-old man was beaten to death for refusing to leave his house that was expropriated for demolition. Following this instance, the employment of violence or coercion, or illegal methods like cutting off the water and power supply, to force homeowners to leave is officially disallowed.

Although these new regulations relate to urban land, the legal principles established have significant implications for the rule of law in China. The outlook for China's Land Administrative law is hopeful as future revisions regarding rural land are expected to occur in the near future.

Controversies

Collectively owned properties in rural China

While having implemented the household production responsibility system, China retains collectively-owned farmland in the rural areas. This creates a large potential for abuse as the critical decisions regarding the land and its use are made by a small number of village leaders. Peter Ho has demonstrated that one of the unresolved issues is the level of collective ownership. Since decollectivization, collective ownership – previously represented by the lowest collective level (former production team) – has been split up in three: the township, administrative village and natural village. Chinese law does not stipulate whether the former production team is still the legal owner.

While the Property Law enacted in 2007 provides some legal leverage to prevent the abuse of power by village councils, it remains to be seen if legal remedies are accessible or are even used by the villagers. Prevailing local culture, the fear of authority and the possibility of violent repercussions hinder a victim's inclination to seek legal recourse. Also, such rules may be disregarded by the committees or councils due to lack of enforcement.

While critics may be skeptical of whether the new enactments clarifying the issue of collective ownership will make a difference, such changes are still welcomed as signs of increasing protection for the rural villagers.

Another issue is the problem of rampant corruption arising from rural land transactions, involving both governmental and non-governmental parties. This leads to over-pricing and also improper use of land that goes unchecked.

Socialist values vs acceptance of free-market economy
With the passing of the Property Law, a number of local legislators fear that "while the new property law would undoubtedly increase protection for home owners and prevent land seizures, it would also erode China's socialist principles."

In 2004, it amended its 1982 Constitution to include that the Government has to pay the person compensation for expropriation (征收) or requisition (征用). However, the article neither provides, either in the constitution or in any subsidiary legislation, for the quantum of the payment, nor does it stipulate that the payment must be proportional to the size of the land. This has led to abuse by government bodies, especially in rural areas. Expropriation of land from farmers is the most frequent cause of complaint among farmers. However, in 2011, the Chinese Government released regulations clarifying this, which promise to provide more transparency and a fairer compensation system.

See also
 Property Law
 Canadian property law
 English property law
 Australian property law
 Scots property law
 South African property law
 Ancient Norwegian property laws

References

External links
Unofficial Translation of Property Law of People's Republic of China by Lehman
Translated Constitution of People's Republic of China
Land Administrative Law of the People's Republic of China